László Sótonyi (born 1970) is a Hungarian handball player and coach. He played for the Hungarian national team at the 1992 Summer Olympics, where the Hungarian team placed seventh.

Sótonyi is head coach for the club Csurgói KK, and second coach for the Hungarian national team.

References

1970 births
Living people
People from Kaposvár
Hungarian male handball players
Hungarian handball coaches
Olympic handball players of Hungary
Handball players at the 1992 Summer Olympics
Sportspeople from Somogy County